The Re-Up Gang is an American hip hop group formed in 2004, in Virginia Beach, Virginia. The group was formed by Pusha T and Malice, brothers and members of Virginia-based hip hop duo Clipse, alongside Philadelphia-based rappers Ab-Liva and Sandman. The Re-Up Gang is perhaps best known for their signature We Got It 4 Cheap mixtape series.

History
The Re-Up Gang was created in early 2004, during Clipse's long hiatus between their first and second albums. The group includes Clipse themselves, as well as long-time friend Ab-Liva of Major Figgas. Pusha T is credited with founding the group, and was responsible for enlisting the help of mixtape DJ Clinton Sparks to put together their first mixtape in an ongoing series, We Got It 4 Cheap: Vol. 1. While a Re-Up Gang album is planned, no specifics have been released due to Clipse's legal issues with Jive Records. On August 5, 2008 (UK: September 8, 2008) the group released an album on Koch Records titled Clipse Presents: Re-Up Gang. The album featured nine new songs and three unreleased remixes from We Got It 4 Cheap Vol. III. Rapper Pusha T said:
"Everything happens for a reason. We put out the We Got It 4 Cheap series on our own for the streets and that helped keep us visible and build the Re-Up name as an entity ... This time, [our manager] Tony Draper got with [Koch General Manager] Alan Grunblatt to put together an official album with new music and let Koch Records do what they do best. This release gives us something fresh in the marketplace to reward Re-Up fans while we continue to work on the Clipse album."

According to an interview with HipHopDX the Sandman aka Sandcannnon stated the Re-Up Gang's album had been mishandled. Although there is no animosity between him and the remaining three members, he is now pursuing a solo career. Sandman and Liva still remain in close contact as they always have. All three members are on solo runs with No Malice releasing his solo titled album Hear Ye Him in August 2013 and with Pusha dropping his critically acclaimed My Name Is My Name album in October 2013. Pusha T is currently on Kanye's G.O.O.D Music with Ab-Liva still being by his side as a Re-Up Gang member while No Malice has been focused on his new life while making music with a new direction.

Discography

Studio albums
 2008: Clipse Presents: Re-Up Gang

Mixtapes

 2004: We Got It 4 Cheap: Vol. 1: Introducing The Re-Up Gang
 2005: We Got It 4 Cheap: Vol. 2: The Black Card Era
 2008: We Got It 4 Cheap: Vol. 3: The Spirit of Competition
 2008: The Saga Continues - The Official Mixtape - Remixed & Remastered

References

External links
 

American hip hop groups
African-American musical groups
Musical groups from Virginia
Musical quartets
American musical trios
Musical groups established in 2004
Southern hip hop groups